Zhang Xinyi (born 29 May 1981) is a Chinese actress and director. She ranked 95th on Forbes China Celebrity 100 list in 2013, 99th in 2014, and 80th in 2015.

Biography
Zhang was born in 1981 in Ziyang, Sichuan province. After graduating from the Central Academy of Drama in 2005 she became a dancer and joined the Shenzhen Song and Dance Ensemble.

After appearing in a number of small acting roles Zhang was cast in the 2012 television series Beijing Love Story which was popular and created a fan base for the actress. In 2017 Zhang made her directorial debut with an adaption of the animated comedy. Miss Puff in which she played the main character.

Filmography

Film

Television series

Discography

Personal life
Zhang married Princess Jie You co-star  Yuan Hong in Germany in May 2016.

Awards and nominations

References

External links
 

1981 births
Living people
Actresses from Sichuan
People from Ziyang
Chinese women film directors
Chinese film actresses
Chinese television actresses
21st-century Chinese actresses
Central Academy of Drama alumni